The Cherokee Kid is a 1927 American silent Western film directed by Robert De Lacey and starring Tom Tyler, Sharon Lynn and Jerry Pembroke.

Cast
 Tom Tyler as Bill Duncan 
 Sharon Lynn as Helen Flynne 
 Jerry Pembroke as Rolphe McPherson 
 Bob Burns as Sheriff 
 Bob Reeves as Seth Daggart 
 Ray Childs as Joe Gault 
 James Van Horn as Red Flynne 
 Carol Holloway as Rose

References

External links
 

1927 films
1927 Western (genre) films
Films directed by Robert De Lacey
1920s English-language films
American black-and-white films
Film Booking Offices of America films
Silent American Western (genre) films
1920s American films